Shock Wave is a book written by Clive Cussler. First published in 1996, it is the thirteenth book in Cussler's Dirk Pitt series.  The events in the book take place between January and March 2000.

Plot summary

While investigating the deaths of a large number of marine animals, Dirk Pitt and Al Giordino encounter a group of tourists on Seymour Island.  Aboard the tourists' cruise ship (the Polar Queen), a mysterious "disease" has killed everyone on board. The tourists are brought to the Ice Hunter, a research vessel for the National Underwater and Marine Agency (NUMA). Here, they find out that the Polar Queen is missing and will not respond to their calls. After some searching, Pitt and Al discover that the missing ship is heading towards a cliff. After being winched onto the ship from a helicopter, Pitt steers and manages to narrowly avoid the crash. But he finds only one surviving passenger on board: Deirdre.  Maeve, the tour guide from Seymour Island, is Deirdre's sister, and she seems perplexed to find Deirdre aboard.

Pitt and Al uncover more evidence to suggest that the passengers of the Polar Queen  were killed by extremely high-powered soundwaves. At this time, more outbreaks occur on a cargo ship and a Chinese junk. The cargo ship blows up while a boarding party from a passing ship is aboard; in the distance, a futuristic yacht is spotted heading away from the scene. We learn that the yacht belongs to the Dorsett Consolidated Mining Company, a gemstone mining company headed by the ruthless Arthur Dorsett. Dorsett is also the father of Maeve, Deirdre and a third daughter, Boudicca. Of Dorsett's three daughters, Maeve is the only one who does not work for his company.  As a young girl, she ran away from home, broke all bonds with her family, and changed her last name to Fletcher.

By borrowing the US Navy sonar net in the Pacific, NUMA discovers that the acoustic plague appears to be caused by a convergence of soundwaves from four sources around the Pacific: in the southwest, Gladiator Island; in the northwest, one of the Commander Islands; in the northeast, Kunghit Island; and in the southeast, Easter Island. Since Kunghit Island is located not far from the United States, Pitt decides to go there to investigate. He enlists the help of Mason Broadmoor, a Native American fisherman who, along with his associates, delivers fish to the Kunghit Island mine every week. During one such visit, Pitt is smuggled onto the island and given a tour of the mine by a disgruntled employee, who, Pitt finds out, is Clive Cussler. The mine has a revolutionary mining method in which high-powered soundwaves are used to dig through clay containing diamonds. Pitt learns that the Dorsetts have kidnapped both of Maeve's sons and are holding them hostage.  The company security force captures Pitt as he leaves the island, but Broadmoor rescues him, and the two escape using jet skis.

Soon after returning to the US, Pitt, Al and Maeve are sent to Wellington to board another research vessel, the Ocean Angler. Their mission is to covertly infiltrate Gladiator Island, find Maeve's sons, and bring everybody back to the vessel. However, the plan is derailed when the pickup car drives them to a Dorsett company warehouse instead of to the research vessel. After a failed escape attempt, they are all brought onto the Dorsett yacht and immediately put out to sea. After about a day, Pitt, Al and Maeve are abandoned in the southwest Pacific Ocean, in a small craft  and far away from ordinary shipping routes; in addition, a tropical cyclone is quickly approaching.

Meanwhile, the NUMA computer center in Washington discovers a way to predict the coming convergence zones, and in a few weeks the Hawaiian island of Oahu will be hit. The head of NUMA, Admiral James Sandecker, fails to convince the President of the looming threat, so he launches a clandestine operation to avert the disaster. The plan is to reflect the soundwaves from the convergence zone back towards Gladiator Island. A giant reflector is obtained from a government agency; it is dismantled, loaded onto the famous deep-sea recovery ship Glomar Explorer, and brought into the convergence zone.

Pitt, Al, and Maeve have successfully endured the storm and finally stumbled upon a small island. Here they find the remains of a sailboat, which they use along with their own battered craft to build a small sailship. With this ship, they set course for Gladiator Island, planning to rescue Maeve's sons from her evil family. As they climb ashore, the sound reflector outside Oahu successfully reflects the high-powered soundwave toward Gladiator Island. At the same time, scientists realize that this could cause both volcanoes on the island to erupt. Admiral Sandecker is shocked when he receives a call from Pitt, using Mr. Dorsett's phone.

Pitt and Al rescue Maeve's sons and kill Arthur, Boudicca and Deirdre Dorsett; however, Deirdre fatally shoots Maeve before Pitt kills her. Pitt and Al flee, using the Dorsett yacht to make their escape.  Al takes the children aboard a helicopter that was parked on the yacht, and as they fly away from the island, Al sees the yacht engulfed by a pyroclastic ash cloud with Pitt still on board.

Al arrives at a safe landing point, where he is recruited by rescue officials to fly back to the island. Al is concerned about what he will find there, but he has already decided to fly back and try to rescue his friend Pitt. Al also agrees to take a load of food, fresh water, and medical supplies to the islanders, who will most certainly need the items in the days following the eruptions. Upon his arrival at the island, Al is told that the authorities have received no radio communication to suggest that Pitt is still alive.  As Al begins to mourn the loss of his best friend, he hears new information about a stranded yacht that has been seen floating several miles from the island.  Al, feeling it might be Pitt, flies the helicopter to the coordinates hoping to find Pitt alive.

Al indeed finds that Pitt is alive, having survived by barricading himself from the searing heat of the ash cloud.  Sadly, however, Maeve is discovered dead from the injuries she sustained at the hand of her sister. We also discover that, prior to her untimely death, she and Pitt had pledged their deepest love for each other.

After Pitt is rescued, he flies back to D.C. on a commercial jet flight and heads home, but not before spending some time in a hospital recovering from his very serious injuries.

1996 American novels
Dirk Pitt novels
Novels set in Antarctica
Fiction set in 2000
Books with cover art by Paul Bacon